Cancer phobia, also known as carcinophobia, is a common phobia and an anxiety disorder characterized by the chronic fear of developing cancer. It can manifest in tremendous feelings of sadness, fear, panic, and distress. In some cases, the phobia can be so extreme that it prevents the individual from living a normal life.

Signs and symptoms 

People living with carcinophobia frequently suffer from depression. Sufferers may become reclusive and obsessive over their health. They may feel overwhelmed and fail to carry out their usual functions. The fear is associated with lack of future planning, and an overall poor quality of life.

Symptoms of carcinophobia can vary from person to person, but may include physical symptoms such as sweating, trembling, and rapid heartbeat, as well as psychological symptoms such as anxiety, panic attacks, and avoidance behavior. The mere thought or anticipation of having cancer can trigger these symptoms, making it difficult for people with carcinophobia to seek necessary medical treatment.

Causes 

Cancer survivors are also susceptible to developing a debilitating fear of recurrence due to their previous experience with the disease. Half of all cancer survivors report a moderate to high fear of recurrence. 

Cancer phobia can also appear in people suffering from Hypochondria. PTSD is also a common cause of the phobia. Anyone can have the phobia. Traumatic events that can lead to this phobia include:

•Having been previously infected with Cancer. 

•A loved one suffering from Cancer.

•A loved one dying from Cancer.

Treatment 
Cognitive behavioral therapy (CBT) is used for a wide variety of fears and phobias, including carcinophobia. It helps patients to increase awareness of their disorder, and provides ways for patients to cope with their emotions.

References 

*
Phobias